Genzerig (also Romanized as Genzerīg; also known as Ganīzī Zīrīk, Ganzerīk, Ganzrīk, and Genzerīk) is a village in Irandegan Rural District, Irandegan District, Khash County, Sistan and Baluchestan Province, Iran. At the 2006 census, its population was 72, in 14 families.

References 

Populated places in Khash County